Bavi Edna "Nedi" Rivera (born March 24, 1946) is a bishop of the Episcopal Church who has been a suffragan bishop in the Diocese of Olympia and appointed Bishop of the Diocese of Eastern Oregon. She was the first Hispanic woman elected to become a bishop in the Episcopal Church. Her late father, Victor Rivera, was also a bishop in the church.

Early years
Rivera is one of three daughters born to a Puerto Rican father, Victor Rivera (an Episcopal priest and subsequently third bishop (1968–1988) of the Episcopal Diocese of San Joaquin, California) and an Anglo mother, Barbara Ross Starbuck.  Rivera grew up in Visalia, California and went to an Episcopal convent boarding school in Tucson, Arizona. A nun at the convent advised her to attend Wheaton College in Massachusetts, believing that Rivera would like it there. At Wheaton she majored in Physics and also took calculus. In 1968, she earned a BA in physics and married six weeks after her graduation. Instead of pursuing a career in physics, she dedicated herself to her two daughters and two sons and volunteer work that included convening a youth group for church in her home and bookkeeping. Having divorced in 1976, she married another priest, Robert "Bob" Moore, on February 16, 1979. Both subsequently served at various churches in the dioceses of California and El Camino Real.

Ordination
In 1972, Rivera learned at a meeting that the church was planning on ordaining women as priests. Being raised within the religious beliefs of the Episcopal Church served as an influential factor when she decided that she wanted to become a priest. However, one of the obstacles that she would have to face was convincing her father, at that time the Bishop of San Joaquin, and a staunch opponent of the ordination of women. In spite of his opposition, Rivera attended the seminary and was ordained a deacon in June 1975. In 1976, she earned her Master of Divinity degree from the Church Divinity School of the Pacific (CDSP) in Berkeley, California and on June of that same year, she was ordained to the priesthood. Her father did not attend her ordination. She served as the Rector of St. George's Episcopal Church, Salinas, in California's Diocese of El Camino Real, from 1984 to 1993. From 1994 to 2004, she served as rector of St. Aidan's Episcopal Church in San Francisco.

First Hispanic woman consecrated bishop
Rivera was elected as a suffragan bishop in the Diocese of Olympia in 2004 and was consecrated bishop on January 22, 2005. She was the first Hispanic woman to become a bishop in the Episcopal Church. (She had to work hard to become conversant in Spanish (English was spoken at home) but now celebrates and preaches in Spanish.) It is a custom of the church that when a new bishop is ordained, the other bishops gather around the new bishop and lay their hands his/her head while the prayer of ordination is recited. Her father, who had a change of heart, was among the ordaining bishops present, and vested her with his own cope when she was vested as a bishop during the ceremony.

At the Diocese of Olympia, which is located in Seattle, Washington, she oversaw particular ministries, including evangelism, faith formation and ethnic ministries. As a member of the diocesan's "We Will Stand With You team", she provided the leadership and support for ongoing fund-raising to rebuild St. Paul's Episcopal Church and School in New Orleans that was devastated by Hurricane Katrina in 2005. She helped to start an initiative to get the diocese to buy 30,000 malaria nets to be distributed in African countries. On the occasion of her election and ordination as bishop, she received a D.D. (Doctor of Divinity - honorary) degree from the Church Divinity School of the Pacific).

Other assignments
Rivera stood unsuccessfully for election as the diocesan Bishop of Olympia in 2007 and remained in the position of bishop suffragan. In May 2009 she was elected as provisional bishop of the Diocese of Eastern Oregon. The position was part-time, initially held concurrently with her work in Olympia, from which she resigned in January 2010. Her appointment in Eastern Oregon has been extended twice, and her current appointment is to March 2015. Bishop Rivera is currently (2016) Bishop Protector of the Community of St Francis  (Province of the Americas), part of an international community of women in the Anglican Communion, who seek to live the Gospel life fervently in the Church and the world, after the example of St Francis of Assisi.

See also

List of Puerto Ricans
History of women in Puerto Rico

References

1946 births
Living people
People from Visalia, California
American people of Puerto Rican descent
American Episcopal priests
Women Anglican bishops
Wheaton College (Massachusetts) alumni
Church Divinity School of the Pacific alumni
Episcopal Church in Oregon
Episcopal bishops of Southern Ohio
Episcopal bishops of Eastern Oregon
Episcopal bishops of Olympia